is the title of a tokusatsu series produced by Toho. The series, consisting of 26 episodes, is a result of joint production with Nippon Television, and aired in Japan starting on October 3, 1976 until the 23 March 1977.

This was Toho's first direct answer to the Super Sentai series (particularly the first series, Himitsu Sentai Gorenger, which was still running on TV Asahi at the time), in that this series has five color-coded superheroes (a red leader, blue, pink, and two yellows).  In this series, a team of five kids (a teenage boy, a teenage girl, and three young boys, two of whom are siblings), form the top-secret "Bankid" superhero team ("Bankid" is derived from the Japanese word "enban" - "saucer"), to fight the evil Bukimi Aliens ("bukimi" - Japanese for "weird," "eerie"), led by the mysterious Commander Guzare, who plots to invade Earth.

This series is also notable in that veteran designer Tohl Narita (the designer of Ultraman, Ultra Seven, the Gargantuas, etc.) designed the Bukimi Aliens, starting with Episode #6.

Cast 
 Noboru Tenma (天馬昇) / Bankid Pegasus (バンキッドペガサス): Eiji Okuda
 Ryuuichi Uzaki (宇崎龍一) / Bankid Dragon (バンキッドドラゴン): Tomohiro Tanabe
 Ryuuji Uzaki (宇崎龍二) / Bankid Rabbit (バンキッドラビット): Tatsuyuki Tsuji
 Ichiro Ushijima (牛島一郎) / Bankid Ox (バンキッドオックス): Akinori Umezu
 Honoka Shiratori (白鳥ほのか) / Bankid Swan (バンキッドスワン): Yoshie Suzuki
 Hirohiko Uzaki (宇崎博彦): Hiroshi Yagyu
 Tokie Uzaki (宇崎とき枝): Toki Shiozawa
 Isao Uzaki (宇崎巌): Masami Shimojo
 Commander Guzare (グザレ司令): Akihiko Hirata / voice: Kiyoshi Kobayashi
 Narrator (ナレーター): Ryo Kurosawa

External links 
 Files in Enban Sensou Bankid in Japan Hero

Tokusatsu television series
1976 Japanese television series debuts
1977 Japanese television series endings
Toho tokusatsu
Nippon TV original programming
Transforming heroes